This is a list of films produced by the Bollywood film industry based in Mumbai in 2004.

Top-earning films
The top 10 highest worldwide grossing Bollywood films of 2004 are as follows:

List of release films

References

External links

2004
Lists of 2004 films by country or language
Bollywood
2004 in Indian cinema